Tashkent State Agrarian University (Uzbek: 	
Toshkent davlat agrar universiteti, Russian: 	
Ташкентский государственный аграрный университет) or TSAU is an agricultural university located in Tashkent, Uzbekistan.

History 
The formation of Tashkent State Agrarian University was closely linked with name of Mirzo Ulugbek National University, founded in 1918 by local intellectuals, as many other Central Asian universities. In the 1920s, there were 8 faculties among them there were agricultural one. On May 26, 1930, on the basis of this faculty, the Central Asian Agricultural Institute was established and after some changes, it was renamed the Tashkent Agricultural Institute in October 1934. In April 1991, the university received the status of Tashkent State Agrarian University.

Courses 
This university offers the following courses—
 The Faculty of Agrobiology
 Bachelor's degree
 Agronomy (by types of agricultural products)
 Breeding and seed production of agricultural crops (by type of crop)
 Master's degree
 Agronomy
 Crop production (by crop groups)
 Faculty of Fruit and vegetable grooving and viticulture
 Bachelor's degree
 Fruit growing and viticulture
 Horticulture, vegetable and potato growing
 Organization and maintenance of greenhouses
 Agrobiotechnology
 Ecological safety in agriculture
 Master's degree
 Potato growing
 Fruit growing and vegetable grooving on secure soil
 Vegetable growing and horticulture
 Biotechnologies in fruit and vegetable growing
 Fruit growing
 Faculty of Plant Protection and Agrochemistry
 Bachelor's degree
 Agrochemistry and agrarian soil
 Plant protection
 Quarantine of plants and agricultural products
 Master's degree
 Agro soil science and agrophysics (by branches)
 Agrochemistry
 Plant protection (by methods)
 Entomology
 Herbal medicine
 Quarantine of plants and agricultural products
 Faculty of storage and processing of products based on innovative technologies
 Bachelor's degree
 Technology of storage and primary processing of agricultural products (by product type)
 Standardization and certification of agricultural products
 Agribusiness and investment activities
 Agrologistics
 Accounting in the agricultural industry
 Faculty silkworm and breeding
 Bachelor's degree
 Sericulture and tuticulture
 Fishing
 Master's degree
 Sericulture
 Fishbreeding
 Mulberry
 Forestry and ornamental gardening
 Bachelor's degree

See also 

TEAM University Tashkent
Turin Polytechnic University in Tashkent
Inha University in Tashkent
Tashkent State Technical University
Tashkent Institute of Irrigation and Melioration
Tashkent Financial Institute
Tashkent Automobile and Road Construction Institute
Management Development Institute of Singapore in Tashkent
Tashkent State University of Economics
Tashkent State Agrarian University
Tashkent State University of Law
Tashkent University of Information Technologies
University of World Economy and Diplomacy
Westminster International University in Tashkent

References

External links 
 

Universities in Uzbekistan
Educational institutions established in 1930
Agricultural universities and colleges
1930 establishments in the Soviet Union